Daya Nuclear Power Plant is a nuclear power plant located in Daya Bay in Longgang District, along the eastern extremity of Shenzhen, Guangdong, China; and to the north east of Hong Kong.  Daya Bay has two 944 MWe PWR nuclear reactors based on the Framatome ANP French 900 MWe three cooling loop design (M310), were both commissioned in 1993 and started commercial operation in 1993 and 1994 respectively.

History
The Hong Kong-based British businessman and owner of CLP Power, Lawrence Kadoorie, conceived of the plan to build a nuclear plant in Guangdong province to provide electricity to both Hong Kong and Southern China. Kadoorie envisioned the plant as part of a "grand strategy" to enhance economic links with Mainland China and help to preserve British administration of Hong Kong. British Prime Minister Margaret Thatcher was enthusiastic about the plan and committed to the support of the UK Department of Industry. Chinese paramount leader Deng Xiaoping was also enthusiastic about the proposed nuclear plan. At a 1985 meeting between Deng and Kadoorie the two men expressed a desire to celebrate the planned commissioning of the first reactor in 1992, despite their advanced age.

In 1985, the building of Daya Bay nuclear power plant incited controversy and led to objections from prominent politicians in nearby Hong Kong, such as Martin Lee and Szeto Wah, legislative councillors, district board members. A million people, or one fifth of Hong Kong's population at the time, signed a petition opposing nuclear power. Over a hundred community groups brought discussion on the construction, with the opposition primarily focusing on environmental issues and the rights of Hong Kong residents.

Unit 1 began power operations on August 31, 1993, and Unit 2 began power operations on February 2, 1994.  The reactors were designed and built by the French National Company, Framatome, with Chinese participation. The plants were originally named Guangdong-1 and Guangdong-2 in the IAEA PRIS database.

Organisational structure 
Daya Bay and the adjacent Ling Ao Nuclear Power Plant are operated together by Daya Bay Nuclear Power Operations and Management Co (DNMC), an affiliate of China General Nuclear Power Group (CGN).

Daya Bay is 25% owned by Hong Kong-listed CLP Group, which buys about 80% of the plant's output to supply Hong Kong's power needs. 75% is owned by Guangdong Nuclear Investment, a subsidiary of CGN.

Incidents

Missing reinforcing bars
On 9 October 1987, the Hong Kong Legislative Council task force was informed that 316 steel reinforcing bars were missing from the reactor platform of Unit 1. There should have been 8080 bars in the whole structure and 576 bars in the Unit 1 reactor platform.

The incident was discovered and concealed by the operating company in September 1987. It was disclosed by a local Hong Kong newspaper in October. The concrete platform did not meet the specifications set. Company officials explained that the incident was due to a "mistaken perception" of the architectural drawings.

In the aftermath of the incident, steps were taken to remedy the missing reinforcing bars. Extra reinforcement would be applied on the second layer of concrete for the shortfall on the first of the five layers. A Hong Kong Legislative Councillor, Jackie Chan, who was a civil engineer by trade criticised attempts to downplay the issue which focused on the fact that "only 2 per cent" of the total number of bars were missing. The 316 missing bars localised to the reactor platform which would have resulted in 55 per cent reduction in the total of 576 bars.

The Bulletin of the Atomic Scientists reported the incident in 1991 with a title "Hong Kong fears Chinese Chernobyl".

Alleged radioactive leak
On June 16, 2010 Radio Free Asia informed that there was a leak in one of the fuel tubes. Officials denied this information stating that "Daya Bay's two reactor units are functioning safely and stably. There has been no radioactive leak". Radio Free Asia quoted an unidentified expert, saying that radioactive iodine had been released. They also claimed the incident had not been immediately reported to the government, and was kept secret for some time. The New York Times reported differently, quoting one of the shareholders of the plant, China Light & Power (CLP), a Hong Kong-based utility, that the government nuclear safety watchdog in both mainland China and Hong Kong were notified and briefed. CLP said in a statement that the leak was small and fell below international standards requiring reporting as a safety issue. No radioactive monitoring stations in Hong Kong detected any rise in radioactivity. Mainland China news outlets also quoted officials explaining the situation, which was considered under normal operation conditions and fell below international standards for reporting.

Safety
In April 2011, Daya Bay Power Plant won an unprecedented four out of six awards in the annual nuclear power plant safety competition held by EDF Energy. "Everyone was shocked by Daya Bay's figures, especially for repairs and maintenance," said Liu Changshen, General Manager of Daya Bay Nuclear Power Company. The Daya Bay Nuclear Power Plant also stood out as its staff are exposed to a minimal amount of radiation - only 0.8 millisieverts, the equivalent to an x-ray (which 1 out 400 people get every year in the general population).

See also 

 Daya Bay Reactor Neutrino Experiment
 Ling Ao Nuclear Power Plant
 Nuclear power in China
 CPR-1000
 Nuclear energy in Hong Kong

Reactor data
The Day Bay Nuclear Power Plant consist of 2 operational reactors.

References

External links 

Hong Kong Nuclear Investment Co. Ltd (Flash Player required)
Daya Bay Reactor Neutrino Experiment Website

Nuclear power stations in China
Buildings and structures in Guangdong
1993 establishments in China
Nuclear power stations using pressurized water reactors